Jeffries Bluff is the ice-covered southern point of Kemp Peninsula on the Lassiter Coast of Palmer Land, Antarctica. The feature was photographed from the air by the United States Antarctic Service in December 1940, surveyed by the joint Ronne Antarctic Research Expedition – Falkland Islands Dependencies Survey sledge party in November 1947 and rephotographed by the U.S. Navy, 1965–67. In association with Cape Deacon to the northeast, it was named by the UK Antarctic Place-Names Committee in 1981 after Margaret Elsa Jeffries, a member of the staff of the Discovery Committee in about 1930, and later the wife of George Deacon.

References

Cliffs of Palmer Land